Aginskoye (Aga; , Ag) is an urban locality (an urban-type settlement) and the administrative center of Agin-Buryat Okrug and of Aginsky District in Zabaykalsky Krai, Russia. It is located in the valley of the Aga River (the Amur basin). Population:    7,200 (1967).

History
It was founded in 1781 or, according to other sources, in 1811.

Administrative and municipal status
Within the framework of administrative divisions, Aginskoye serves as the administrative center of Aginsky District and is subordinated to it. As a municipal division, the urban-type settlement of Aginskoye together with one rural locality in Aginsky District is incorporated as Aginskoye Urban Okrug.

Climate

References

Notes

Sources

Urban-type settlements in Zabaykalsky Krai
1781 establishments in the Russian Empire
